Adventure is the 20th studio album by pop-punk band Shonen Knife. It was released in 2016. According to Bob Lange of Glide Magazine, Adventure is Shonen Knife's most rock-oriented album. According to Anna Rose, the lyrics of the songs in the album are upbeat. To promote the album, the band went on its "2017 USA Ramen Adventure Tour".

Track list

All songs written by Naoko Yamano

Personnel 
Naoko Yamano - guitar, vocals
Atsuko Yamano - bass, backing vocals
Risa Kawano - drums, backing vocals

References

2016 albums
Shonen Knife albums